Queen's Golden Jubilee may refer to:
 Golden Jubilee of Queen Victoria in 1887
 Golden Jubilee of Elizabeth II in 2002
 Golden Jubilee of Margrethe II in 2022